Ondřej Balvín (born September 20, 1992) is a Czech professional basketball player for Prometey of the Latvian-Estonian Basketball League and EuroCup. As well as Latvia, Balvin has played club basketball in the Czech Republic, Spain, Germany, and Japan.

Professional career
From 2009 to 2010 he played with USK Praha. In 2010 he signed with Baloncesto Sevilla of the Spanish Liga ACB, where he played for the next six seasons. 

He went undrafted in the 2014 NBA draft.

In July 2016, Balvín joined the Denver Nuggets for the 2016 NBA Summer League. On July 25, 2016, he signed a two-year contract with Bayern Munich of the German Basketball Bundesliga. 

On January 31, 2017, he returned to Spain and signed with Movistar Estudiantes, on loan till the end of the 2016–17 ACB season.

On July 1, 2017, Balvín signed a one-year deal with an option for another season with Herbalife Gran Canaria of the Spanish Liga ACB. 

On July 23, 2019, Balvín signed a one-year deal with RETAbet Bilbao Basket. He averaged 8.6 points and 7.3 rebounds per game. Balvin extended his contract by a season on June 3, 2020.

On June 28, 2021, Balvin signed with the Gunma Crane Thunders of the B.League for the 2021–22 season. 

On July 26, 2022, he has signed with Prometey of the Latvian-Estonian Basketball League.

National team career
Balvín played in all categories of the Czech Republic national basketball team. He joined the senior squad for the first time in 2011 for playing the EuroBasket Division B.

References

External links
 Ondřej Balvín at acb.com 
 Ondřej Balvín at eurobasket.com
 Ondřej Balvín at euroleague.net
 Ondřej Balvín at fiba.com

1992 births
Living people
2019 FIBA Basketball World Cup players
Basketball players at the 2020 Summer Olympics
BC Prometey players
Bilbao Basket players
CB Estudiantes players
CB Gran Canaria players
Centers (basketball)
Czech expatriate basketball people in Germany
Czech expatriate basketball people in Spain
Czech men's basketball players
FC Bayern Munich basketball players
Gunma Crane Thunders players
Liga ACB players
Olympic basketball players of the Czech Republic
Real Betis Baloncesto players
Sportspeople from Ústí nad Labem
USK Praha players